Glaphyra was launched at Calcutta in 1814. She came to England in 1821 and thereafter sailed as a West Indiaman. She was wrecked on 19 June 1854.

Career
Glaphyra, Granger, master, arrived at the Cape of Good Hope on 9 December 1820 from Mauritius. She arrived at Portsmouth on 18 March 1821 from Mauritius and Batavia. She arrived at Gravesend on 2 May from Antwerp.

Glaphyra first appeared in Lloyd's Register (LR) in 1821.

Her ground tier was washed out and she had six feet of water in her hold. She became too unstable to carry her topmasts. She arrived at Deal o 20 July, towed by a steamer. By 1 September she was cleared outbound for Antigua with cargo.

Fate
On 19 June 1854 Glaphyra wrecked on the east point of Nevis. She was on a voyage from London to Saint Kitts. Her cargo was saved, but had suffered damage. The hull, cargo, and stores were sold.

Notes, citations, and references
Notes

Citations

References
 
 

1814 ships
British ships built in India
Age of Sail merchant ships of England
Maritime incidents in June 1854